Museum Enschedé is a defunct museum that was located in the center of Haarlem, Netherlands, on the Klokhuisplein 5, across from the St. Bavochurch.

History

In 1904 the museum was founded in a building that was part of the first printing complex in use by Joh. Enschedé, a historical site in Haarlem that was dug up in the 1990s and is today home to an underground parking garage. The building was previously a workshop for the Grafische Inrichting, or Typography. The Joh. Enschedé company was at one time the largest printer in the Netherlands which from 1737 to 1940 printed the Oprechte Haerlemsche Courant and from 1810 onwards became a mint that printed banknotes and later postage stamps. The museum used to have on display an overview of the art of printing in Haarlem and the Typeography of Enschedé in particular. The collection of newspapers has been put online via the Koninklijke Bibliotheek and the collection of atlases by Joan Blaeu has also been digitized. Work is being done to digitize other parts of the collection. There are artifacts regarding Costeriana (things that support the legend of Laurens Janszoon Coster) and the art of printing banknotes through the centuries in Haarlem.

The museum was closed in 1990 when the Joh. Enschedé offices moved to the Oudeweg. In 2015, most of the collections were moved to the Noord-Hollands Archief.

External links 
Information about Museum Enschedé on the website of the Noord-Hollands Archief

Museums in Haarlem
Museums established in 1904
1904 establishments in the Netherlands
Defunct museums in the Netherlands
Printing press museums
20th-century architecture in the Netherlands